This is a small fly whose larvae creates a mine in the leaves of honeysuckle (Lonicera periclymenum) and other closely related species, including Symphoricarpos albus. The mine is initially star-shaped, but as the larvae grows the tunnels become straighter.
This species is widespread and probably common throughout western Europe.

References

Agromyzidae
Diptera of Europe
Insects described in 1851
Leaf miners